State Route 294 (SR 294) is a  long east–west state highway in the northwestern quadrant of the U.S. state of Ohio.

Route description
Along its way, SR 294 travels through the southern portion of Wyandot County and the southwestern part of Crawford County.  There is no segment of SR 294 that is incorporated within the National Highway System (NHS).  The NHS is a network of highways determined to be most important for the economy, mobility and defense of the nation.

History
SR 294 was designated in 1932.  When it was first designated, the highway was a short spur route that was routed along the portion of its present alignment that links U.S. Route 23 (US 23) with the village of Harpster.  On April 15, 1937, SR 294 took on its present shape.  On the west side, the highway was extended west from Harpster to its current western terminus at SR 37.  Simultaneously, SR 294 was extended east of US 23 along its present alignment into Crawford County to a new eastern terminus at SR 98.

Major intersections

See also

References

External links

294
Transportation in Wyandot County, Ohio
Transportation in Crawford County, Ohio